Betsy Nagelsen and Pam Shriver were the defending champions but did not compete that year.

Jana Novotná and Helena Suková won in the final 6–7, 6–1, 6–2 against Patty Fendick and Jill Hetherington.

Seeds
Champion seeds are indicated in bold text while text in italics indicates the round in which those seeds were eliminated. The top four seeded teams received byes into the second round.

Draw

Final

Top half

Bottom half

References
 1989 Danone Hardcourt Championships Doubles Draw

1989 Doubles
1989 WTA Tour
1989 in Australian tennis